David Oei (surname pronounced "Wee", born 1950) is a Hong Kong-born American classical pianist.

Biography 
Oei was born in Hong Kong, into a family that had emigrated from Amoy (Xiamen), Fujian in 1934 to open a branch of The China & South Sea Bank founded by his Chinese-Indonesian great grandfather Oei Ik-Tjoe (黃奕住; pinyin: Huang Yizhu). In Hong Kong, he began studying classical piano at the age of four with Tu Yuet-Sien (屠月仙). At age 9, after winning eleven first prizes at the Hong Kong Music Festival, he was a soloist with the Hong Kong Philharmonic Orchestra. At age 10, he immigrated to the United States by winning a full scholarship to study with Mieczysław Munz at the Peabody Conservatory and later accepted a full scholarship to study with Munz and Ilona Kabos at the Juilliard School from 1964 to 1972, leaving a year short of graduation to perform with Peter Schickele as a member of The Intimate P. D. Q. Bach until 1985.  Schickele regularly introduced him to the audience as having "a black belt in piano". During that same period he also founded the Aspen Soloists, a piano trio that toured extensively under CAMI management. He attended the Interlochen Music Camp from 1963 to 1967 and won the concerto competition in each of those five years. He also won the Concert Artists Guild, WQXR Young Artists, Young Musicians Foundation, and Paul Ulanowsky Chamber Pianists competitions. He became a naturalized U.S. citizen on November 20, 1985.

Oei made his first appearance on U.S. network television on February 22, 1966, on one of the famous Young People's Concerts conducted by Leonard Bernstein (the episode was entitled "Pictures at an Exhibition".

Oei has performed with such major orchestras as the New York Philharmonic, Pittsburgh Symphony Orchestra, Baltimore Symphony Orchestra, Orchestra of St. Luke's, and the Orpheus Chamber Orchestra. In addition, he has performed with The Chamber Music Society of Lincoln Center and is also noted as a performer of the works of P. D. Q. Bach. He appeared on television in Leonard Bernstein's Young People's Concerts, as well as on The Today Show and CBS News Sunday Morning. He has recorded for the ADDA, Arabesque, CRI, Delos, Albany, Grenadilla, New World, Festival Chamber Music, Pro Arte, and Vanguard labels. He is the founding director of the Salon Chamber Soloists and a member of the Festival Chamber Music, Friends Of Mozart and the Elysium and Ecliptica Chamber Ensembles. He is a member of a duo with the Korean-born violinist Chin Kim, with which he has recorded and gives annual concerts. He has performed in a piano duo (performing music for piano four hands as well as for two pianos) with Helene Jeanney.

Oei has taught at Hoff-Barthelson Music School in Scarsdale, New York and in the Preparatory Division at Mannes College of Music.  He has taught at Summertrios and the Bennington Chamber Music Conference. A former regular fixture at Chamber Music Northwest and Bargemusic, he has performed at various festivals including Sitka, Caramoor, OK Mozart, Washington Square Music Festival, and Kuhmo. He has served as an affiliated teacher at the State University of New York at Purchase and he was the Volunteers Coordinator and Head Coach for the Manhattan Special Olympics.

Beginning in the mid-1980s, Oei also served for five years as the Music Director and Production Advisor for Music-Theatre Group's productions of Stanley Silverman and Richard Foreman's Africanis Instructus and Love and Science. In July 2001 he served as the Music Director for the Sundance Theater Workshop production of the opera Yiddisha Teddy Bears (with score by Stewart Wallace and libretto by Richard Foreman).  Oei became a member of the Alaria Chamber Ensemble in 2009.

In April 2015, Oei was arrested and charged with inappropriate fondling of one of his piano students, a 15-year-old girl, in his mid-town home in New York City.  He was suspended by the New School within days afterwards.  In November 2015, Oei accepted a plea bargain with a requirement for mental health treatment for 2 years.

Oei lives in New York City with his wife, the violinist Eriko Sato.

Discography
1974: The Intimate P. D. Q. Bach: John Ferrante (countertenor), David Oei (piano) Vanguard
1978: Karel Husa Sonata: Elmar Oliveira (violin), David Oei (piano) New World
1980: PDQ Bach Liebeslieder Polkas: David Oei (piano), Anne Epperson (piano) Vanguard
1984: Peter Schickele Clarinet Quartet: Eriko Sato (violin), Fred Sherry (cello), David Shifrin (clarinet), David Oei (piano) Vanguard
1989: Schumann & Grieg: Sonia Wieder-Atherton (cello), David Oei (piano) ADDA
1989: David Schiff: Gimpel the Fool: Theodore Arm (violin), Warren Lash (cello), David Shifrin (clarinet), David Oei (piano) Delos
1990: Miriam Gideon Retrospective: Patricia Spencer (flute), David Oei (piano) New World
1993: Prokofiev Violin Sonata No. 2: Chin Kim (violin), David Oei (piano) Pro Arte
1995: Alec Wilder Works For Horn: David Jolley (horn), David Oei (piano) Arabesque
1997: Old Friends: Christopher Lee (violin), David Oei (piano) Quattro Corde
2004: Karel Husa Recollections: Quintet of the Americas, David Oei (piano) New World
2005: Donald Crockett Ceiling Of Heaven: Renee Jolles (violin), Nicolas Cords (viola), Edward Aaron (cello), David Oei (piano) Albany
2007: Strauss and Rachmaninoff Sonatas: Ruth Sommers (cello), David Oei (piano) FCM
2008: The Lay of Love and Death of the Cornet Christoph Rilke by Viktor Ullmann: David Oei (piano), Lutz Rath (speaker)
2010: Five Not-So-Easy Pieces: David Oei (piano), Eriko Sato (violin) Prestissimo

References

External links
David Oei biography from Festival Chamber Music site
David Oei biography from Summertrios site
David Oei biography from Hoff-Barthelson Music School site
 IMDB entry on New York Philharmonic Young People's Concerts, 22 February 1966

1950 births
Living people
American classical pianists
American male pianists
American musicians of Chinese descent
Classical piano duos
Hong Kong emigrants to the United States
Musicians from New York City
20th-century American pianists
Classical musicians from New York (state)
21st-century classical pianists
20th-century American male musicians
21st-century American male musicians
21st-century American pianists